The Radebeul–Radeburg railway, also known as the Lößnitzgrundbahn ("Lössnitz Valley Railway") and locally nicknamed the Lößnitzdackel (Lößnitz Dachshund), is a  gauge narrow gauge steam-hauled railway in the outskirts of Dresden, Germany. It should not be confused with the Lößnitz Tramway, known in German as the Lößnitzbahn or the Lößnitzschaukel, which was a metre gauge interurban tramway that connected Dresden with Radebeul.

Primarily a tourist attraction, the Radebeul–Radeburg railway maintains a year-round timetable and runs between Radebeul East station on the main Deutsche Bahn line between Dresden and Meissen and the small towns of Moritzburg and Radeburg north of Dresden. Scheduled traffic on the line is maintained by Sächsische Dampfeisenbahngesellschaft mbH (former BVO Bahn), using steam locomotives built in the 1950s.

Older trains, using engines and cars built in the late 19th and early 20th century, are maintained by the non-profit Traditionsbahn Radebeul. The older trains operate on the line for special events.

History 
On 12 September 2009, two steam-hauled passenger trains were involved in a head-on collision between Friedewald Bad and Friedewald stations. A total of 121 people were injured, four seriously.

In early 2011, it was reported that proposed budgetary cuts on the Saxon narrow gauge lines may involve the closure of the section of this line from Moritzburg to Radeburg. The section between Radebeul and Moritzburg carries a significant number of tourists visiting Schloss Moritzburg, but the remaining  onward to Radeburg is less used. An alternative proposal was to serve this section with a railcar, allowing a more frequent service as far as Moritzburg without needing additional steam trains. As of June 2020, service is provided along the full route.

List Of Locomotives

References

External links 
 Official website

Radebeul-Radeburg railway (in German)
The Heritage Railway Club (in German)

Heritage railways in Germany
Railway lines in Saxony
Transport in Saxony
750 mm gauge railways in Germany